Givinostat (INN) or gavinostat (originally ITF2357) is a histone deacetylase inhibitor with potential anti-inflammatory, anti-angiogenic, and antineoplastic activities. It is a hydroxamate used in the form of its hydrochloride.

Givinostat is in numerous phase II clinical trials (including for relapsed leukemias and myelomas), and has been granted orphan drug designation in the European Union for the treatment of systemic juvenile idiopathic arthritis, polycythaemia vera. and Duchenne muscular dystrophy.

A preclinical study produced early results suggesting the molecule might help with diastolic dysfunction.

ITF2357 was discovered at Italfarmaco of Milan, Italy. It was patented in 1997 and first described in the scientific literature in 2005.

Adverse effects
In clinical trials of givinostat as a salvage therapy for advanced Hodgkin's lymphoma, the most common adverse reactions were fatigue (seen in 50% of participants), mild diarrhea or abdominal pain (40% of participants), moderate thrombocytopenia (decreased platelet counts, seen in one third of patients), and mild leukopenia (a decrease in white blood cell levels, seen in 30% of patients). One-fifth of patients experienced prolongation of the QT interval, a measure of electrical conduction in the heart, severe enough to warrant temporary suspension of treatment.

Mechanism of action
Givinostat inhibits class I and class II histone deacetylases (HDACs) and several pro-inflammatory cytokines. This reduces expression of tumour necrosis factor (TNF), interleukin 1α and β, and interleukin 6.

It also has activity against cells expressing JAK2(V617F), a mutated form of the janus kinase 2 (JAK2) enzyme that is implicated in the pathophysiology of many myeloproliferative diseases, including polycythaemia vera. In patients with polycythaemia, the reduction of mutant JAK2 concentrations by givinostat is believed to slow down the abnormal growth of erythrocytes and ameliorate the symptoms of the disease.

References

Further reading 

 
 

Hydroxamic acids
Histone deacetylase inhibitors
Orphan drugs
Experimental drugs
Diethylamino compounds